The Tarang Cine Awards are presented annually by Tarang entertainment television channel to honour both artistic and technical excellence of professionals in the Oriya language film industry mainly based in State of Orissa, India.

History 
The awards have been instituted by Orissa Television (ORTEL) Communications that has launched the Taranga exclusive entertainment channel. To commemorate the 75 glorious years of Oriya cinema Bibhuprasad Rath, Director of Orissa Televisions Limited has announced Tarang Cine Awards during the award presentation ceremony in the Bhubaneswar on 26 February 2010.

First Tarang Cine Awards was held at Jawaharlal Nehru Indoor stadium in Cuttack on 2 May 2010.

Second Tarang cine awards held at Capital city Bhubaneswar on 26 February 2011.

Awards
Tarang Cine Awards given in 18 categories to various actors, best directors, singers and other personalities in the year 2010. Apart from this, lifetime achievement award is given to one person for his/her outstanding contribution to the Oriya cine industry.
In the year 2011 adding 3 new categories Awards number goes to 21.

Merit awards
 Best Film
 Best Director
 Best Actor (Male)
 Best Actor (Female)
 Best Actor in a Supporting Role (Male)
 Best Actor in a Supporting Role (Female)
 Best Performance in a Negative Role
 Best Performance in a Comic Role
 Best Music Director
 Best Lyricist
 Best Playback Singer Male
 Best Playback Singer Female
 Best Child Artist
 Best Debutant actor

Technical awards
 Best Story
 Best Screenplay
 Best Dialogue
 Best Action
 Best Art Direction
 Best Background Score
 Best Cinematography
 Best Editing
 Best Choreography
 Best Sound Recording
 Best Special Effects
 Best Costume Design

Special awards
 Life Time Achievement

Past ceremonies
The following is a listing of all Tarang Cine Awards ceremonies and ratings since 2010.

Telecast
The 9th Tarang Cine Awards was telecasted on Tarang TV on Sunday, 1 April 2018 at 6:30 P.M.

References

External links
 www.odisha360.com/events/300/tarang-cine-awards-2010.html Tarang Cine Awards-2010
 www.odisha360.com/events/300/tarang-cine-awards-2010.html Tarang Cine Awards-2010 | Orissa Events | Orissa360
 www.hindu.com/2011/03/07/stories/2011030758950200.htm The Hindu : Other States / Orissa News : Tarang cine awards presented
 https://web.archive.org/web/20150924075005/http://www.orissadiary.com/ShowEntertainmentNews.asp?id=25088 Second Tarang Cine awards showcases the best works in Oriya cinema
 http://www.odishaeye.com/Second-Tarang-Cine-awards-showcases-the-best-works-in-odia-cinema-1863.html Second Tarang Cine awards showcases the best works in Oriya cinema
 https://www.facebook.com/event.php?eid=197167306977931 2nd Tarang Cine Awards
 http://cinemasagar.com/2011/02/second-tarang-cine-awards-ceremony-held/ Second Tarang Cine Awards (2011) Ceremony held
 http://aboutorissa.com/blog/second-tarang-cine-awards-showcases-the-best-works-in-odia-cinema-orissadiary-com Second Tarang Cine awards showcases the best works in Oriya cinema – Orissadiary.com
 https://web.archive.org/web/20111005043609/http://www.orissatv.com/NewsDetail.asp?newsId=NS37945 Bollywood meets Ollywood at Tarang Cine Awards
 https://web.archive.org/web/20120322091321/http://www.odishanewstoday.com/entertainment/184-sanju-aau-sanjana-sweeps-tarang-cine-awards-2011 'Sanju Aau Sanjana' sweeps Tarang Cine Awards 2011

 
Awards established in 2010
Indian film awards
Cinema of Odisha
2010 establishments in Orissa
Odisha awards